Murnau may refer to:

 Murnau am Staffelsee, a town in Bavaria, Germany
 Oflag VII-A Murnau, A German WW 2 POW camp located in the Bavarian town "Murnau am Staffelsee"
 F. W. Murnau (1888−1931), German film director
 Murnau-Werdenfels Cattle, an old, robust dairy breed from Upper Bavaria
 Lieutenant Murnau, a fictional music group
 Murnau the Vampire, 3D Animated Short by Oscar Alvarado